A Cage of Butterflies is a 1992 young adult novel by Australian author Brian Caswell.

Plot summary 
The story is set in a research facility (known as the "farm") involving two groups of people. The first group contains several teenagers with IQs above 150. These teenagers (Greg, Mikki, Lesley, Gordon, Gretel, Katie and Chris) call themselves the "Think Tank". However, this group is merely a smokescreen for the real subjects of the research - five seven-year-olds who are able to communicate telepathically, known as the "Babies". The Babies are called Pep, Ricardo, Ian, Rachael and Myriam. The Babies were all born around the same time in the same hospital.

When the members of the first group are "contacted" by the Babies, they learn of the researchers' exploitation, and, with the help of compassionate workers at the facility (Susan and Erik), investigate the reason for the Babies' condition. The Babies need help as the head researcher, Larsen, will stop at nothing to solve the mystery. The Think Tank, as well as researcher Susan and young orderly Erik, provide this help.

They trick the head researcher, John Larsen, so they can escape. The story ends with the Think Tank six years into the future. They turned the think tank into 'Think Tank Inc.', a company worth three million dollars. The Babies, Think Tank and newlyweds Erik and Susan all live together. Greg and Mikki are also married.

The title, "A Cage of Butterflies" refers to the fact that Larsen and the research staff keep both the Babies and the think tank under constant supervision and keep them "caged" or "prisoners" since they do not allow them to move around freely.

Characters

Think Tank 
Greg
Mikki
Katie
Lesley
Gordon
Gretel
Chris

Researchers/scientists 
Larsen
Susan
Erik
MacIntyre
Richard (formerly)

The Babies 
Ian
Myriam
Ricardo
Rachael
Pep

Awards 
 Shortlisted 3M Talking Book of the Year Award 1993
 Shortlisted CBCA Book of the Year Awards Older Readers 1993

References 

1992 novels
Australian young adult novels
Children's science fiction novels
Australian science fiction novels
1992 science fiction novels
University of Queensland Press books
1992 children's books